The 2016 Capital Football season was the fourth season under the new competition format in the Australian Capital Territory. The overall premier for the new structure qualified for the National Premier Leagues finals series, competing with the other state federation champions in a final knockout tournament to decide the National Premier Leagues Champion for 2016.

League Tables

2016 National Premier League ACT

The 2016 National Premier League ACT season was played over 18 rounds, from April to August 2016.

Finals

Top Scorers

Reference:

2016 ACT Capital League

The 2016 ACT Capital League was the fourth edition of the new Capital League as the second level domestic association football competition in the ACT.

Finals

2016 Capital Football Division 1

The 2016 ACT Capital Football Division 1 was the second edition of the new Capital League Division 1 as the third level domestic association football competition in the ACT. 10 teams competed, all playing each team twice for a total of 18 rounds.

Finals

2016 Women's Premier League 

The highest tier domestic football competition in the ACT is known as the Women's Premier League.  The 6 teams played each other three times, plus a finals series for the top 4 teams.

Finals

Cup Competitions

2016 Federation Cup

2016 was the 54th edition of the Capital Football Federation Cup. The Federation cup acts as the preliminary rounds for the FFA Cup in the ACT with the Cup winner entering the subsequent FFA Cup round of 32. In 2016, the Federation Cup, which is open to all senior men's teams registered with Capital Football, consisted of two rounds, quarter-finals, semi-finals and a final. NPL clubs entered the tournament in the second round. The Cup ran from 26 April 2016 (first round) till 18 June 2016 (final). Olympic defeated Tigers FC in the final 3–1 at Deakin Stadium to clinch the Federation Cup and qualify for the 2016 FFA Cup.

2016 Charity Shield

2016 was the first edition of the annual ACT Charity Shield contested to kick off the 2016 Capital Football season. Money raised from the event goes towards a nominated charity, which in 2016 was The House with No Steps. Canberra FC and Gungahlin United contested the Shield in 2016. Canberra FC claimed the inaugural Charity Shield title with a 4–1 victory.

See also

Soccer in the Australian Capital Territory
Sport in the Australian Capital Territory

References

Capital Football